= Mainlander (restaurant) =

Restaurant in St. Louis, Missouri, U.S.

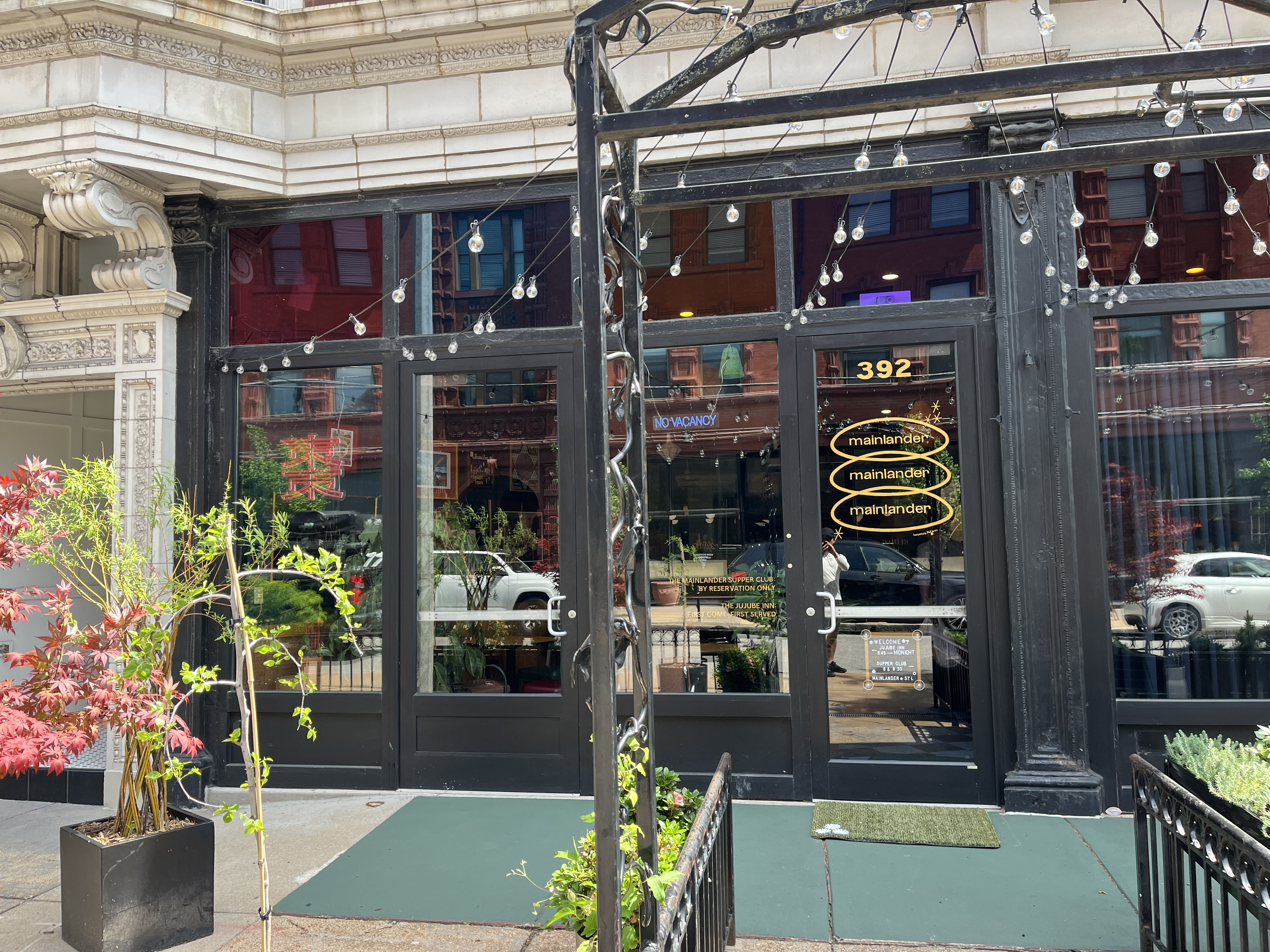
- Interactive map of Mainlander

Restaurant information
- Location: 8 South Euclid Avenue, St. Louis, Missouri, 63108, United States
- Coordinates: 38°38′24″N 90°15′43″W

Mainlander is a restaurant in St. Louis, Missouri. It was a semifinalist in the Best New Restaurant category of the James Beard Foundation Awards in 2024.
